In the 2022–23 season, JS Saoura is competing in the Ligue 1 for the 11th season, as well as the Algerian Cup. It is their 11th consecutive season in the top flight of Algerian football. They competing in Ligue 1, the Algerian Cup and the Confederation Cup.

Squad list
Players and squad numbers last updated on 5 February 2023.Note: Flags indicate national team as has been defined under FIFA eligibility rules. Players may hold more than one non-FIFA nationality.

Pre-season and friendlies

Competitions

Overview

{| class="wikitable" style="text-align: center"
|-
!rowspan=2|Competition
!colspan=8|Record
!rowspan=2|Started round
!rowspan=2|Final position / round
!rowspan=2|First match	
!rowspan=2|Last match
|-
!
!
!
!
!
!
!
!
|-
| Ligue 1

|  
| To be confirmed
| 27 August 2022
| In Progress
|-
| Algerian Cup

| Round of 64 
| To be confirmed
| 17 December 2022
| In Progress
|-
| Confederation Cup

| Second round
| Second round
| 8 October 2022
| 15 October 2022
|-
! Total

Ligue 1

League table

Results summary

Results by round

Matches
The league fixtures were announced on 19 July 2022.

Algerian Cup

Confederation Cup

Qualifying rounds

In the qualifying rounds, each tie will be played on a home-and-away two-legged basis. If the aggregate score will be tied after the second leg, the away goals rule was applied, and if still tied, extra time will not be played, and the penalty shoot-out will be used to determine the winner (Regulations III. 13 & 14).

Second round

Squad information

Playing statistics

|-
! colspan=12 style=background:#dcdcdc; text-align:center| Goalkeepers

|-
! colspan=12 style=background:#dcdcdc; text-align:center| Defenders

|-
! colspan=12 style=background:#dcdcdc; text-align:center| Midfielders

|-
! colspan=12 style=background:#dcdcdc; text-align:center| Forwards

|-
! colspan=12 style=background:#dcdcdc; text-align:center| Players transferred out during the season

Goalscorers

Includes all competitive matches. The list is sorted alphabetically by surname when total goals are equal.

Transfers

In

Summer

Winer

Out

Summer

Winter

References

2022-23
Algerian football clubs 2022–23 season